Odontella is a genus of marine diatoms. It contains the following species:

 Odontella aurita (Lyngbye) C. A. Agardh
 Odontella calamus (Brun & Tempère) H. J. Schrader
 Odontella cornuta (J. Brun) H. J. Schrader
 Odontella granulata (Roper) R. Ross
 Odontella hastata (Greville) J. Fenner ex D. M. Williams
 Odontella litigiosa (Van Heurck) Hoban
 Odontella longicruris (Greville) Hoban
 Odontella mobiliensis (J. W. Bailey) Grunow
 Odontella regia (Schultze) Simonsen
 Odontella rhombus 
 Odontella septentrionalis H. J. Schrader
 Odontella sinensis (Greville) Grunow
 Odontella weissflogii (Janisch) Grunow

References

Coscinodiscophyceae genera